The Castlemaine Football and Netball Club, nicknamed The Magpies, is an Australian rules football and netball club based in Castlemaine, Victoria, Australia and is currently a member of the Bendigo Football League.

The club is notable for several reasons. Formed in 1859, it is the second oldest documented football club in Australia after the Melbourne Football Club and it has produced many notable Australian rules footballers.

History

Foundation
The "Castlemaine Football Club" was formed on 15 June 1859 at the Supreme Court Hotel and chaired by T Butterworth. Castlemaine played its first match on 22 June 1859 on the Cricket Ground Barkers Creek.

Records for the foundation date was discovered in 2007 which rewrote history; as many had previously believed that the Geelong Football Club had been formed earlier.

Competition
The club was formed in an era before codified rules organised competition, but according to some sources, including Graeme Atkinson, "football" was popular in the goldfields region; and, without a league to participate in, the club was an irregular competitor during its first decade.

Uniform
The original uniform was a white cap with royal-blue Maltese cross.

1925
In 1925, Castlemaine joined the Bendigo Football League, Coached by the West Australian champion Phil Matson, Castlemaine made the 1925 Grand Final, but lost to South Bendigo by 14 Points: 7.12 (54) to 6.4 (40).

Alumni

Castlemaine players in the VFL/AFL

References

External links 

Official website

Australian rules football clubs established in 1859
Australian rules football clubs in Victoria (Australia)
1859 establishments in Australia
Bendigo Football League clubs